The 2017 Canberra Tennis International was a professional tennis tournament played on outdoor hard courts. It was the third edition of the tournament and was part of the 2017 ATP Challenger Tour and the 2017 ITF Women's Circuit. It took place in Canberra, Australia, on 30 October–5 November 2017.

Men's singles main draw entrants

Seeds 

 1 Rankings as of 23 October 2017.

Other entrants 
The following players received a wildcard into the singles main draw:
  Blake Ellis
  Jacob Grills
  Benard Bruno Nkomba

The following player received entry into the singles main draw using a protected ranking:
  Jason Kubler

The following player received entry into the singles main draw as a special exempt:
  Blake Ellis

The following player received entry into the singles main draw as an alternate:
  Omar Jasika

The following players received entry from the qualifying draw:
  Matthew Barton
  Gavin van Peperzeel
  Dane Propoggia
  Calum Puttergill

The following players received entry as lucky losers:
  Benjamin Mitchell
  Christopher O'Connell

Women's singles main draw entrants

Seeds 

 1 Rankings as of 23 October 2017.

Other entrants 
The following players received a wildcard into the singles main draw:
  Alexandra Bozovic
  Belinda Woolcock

The following players received entry from the qualifying draw:
  Priscilla Hon
  Masa Jovanovic
  Kaylah McPhee
  Ramu Ueda

Champions

Men's singles

 Matthew Ebden def.  Taro Daniel 7–6(7–4), 6–4.

Women's singles

 Olivia Rogowska def.  Destanee Aiava, 6–1, 6–2

Men's doubles
 
 Alex Bolt /  Bradley Mousley def.  Luke Saville /  Andrew Whittington 6–3, 6–2.

Women's doubles
 
 Asia Muhammad /  Arina Rodionova def.  Jessica Moore /  Ellen Perez, 6–4, 6–4

References

External links 
 2017 Canberra Tennis International at ITFtennis.com
 Official website

Canberra Tennis International
2017 ITF Women's Circuit
2017 in Australian tennis
2017